The 1957 Cincinnati Redlegs season consisted of the Redlegs finishing in fourth place in the National League, with a record of 80–74, 15 games behind the NL and World Series Champion Milwaukee Braves. The Redlegs were managed by Birdie Tebbetts and played their home games at Crosley Field, where they attracted 1,070,850 fans, fourth in the eight-team league.

Offseason 
 November 13, 1956: Ray Jablonski and Elmer Singleton were traded by the Redlegs to the Chicago Cubs for Don Hoak, Warren Hacker, and Pete Whisenant.
 December 3, 1956: Maury Wills was drafted by the Redlegs from the Brooklyn Dodgers in the 1956 minor league draft.

Regular season

Season standings

Record vs. opponents

Notable transactions 
 June 26, 1957: Warren Hacker was selected off waivers from the Redlegs by the Philadelphia Phillies.

Roster

Player stats

Batting

Starters by position 
Note: Pos = Position; G = Games played; AB = At bats; H = Hits; Avg. = Batting average; HR = Home runs; RBI = Runs batted in

Other batters 
Note: G = Games played; AB = At bats; H = Hits; Avg. = Batting average; HR = Home runs; RBI = Runs batted in

Pitching

Starting pitchers 
Note: G = Games pitched; IP = Innings pitched; W = Wins; L = Losses; ERA = Earned run average; SO = Strikeouts

Other pitchers 
Note: G = Games pitched; IP = Innings pitched; W = Wins; L = Losses; ERA = Earned run average; SO = Strikeouts

Relief pitchers 
Note: G = Games pitched; W = Wins; L = Losses; SV = Saves; ERA = Earned run average; SO = Strikeouts

Farm system 

LEAGUE CO-CHAMPIONS: GracevillePort Arthur franchise transferred to Temple, May 30, 1957, then folded, August 20; Clovis franchise folded, June 16; Hornell replaced disbanded Bradford franchise in mid-season and began play May 28

References

External links
1957 Cincinnati Redlegs season at Baseball Reference

Cincinnati Reds seasons
Cincinnati Redlegs season
Cincinnati Reds